Bror Ingemar Ture Johansson (25 April 1924 – 18 April 2009) was a Swedish race walker who won a silver medal in the 10 km at the 1948 Summer Olympics. He was also an accomplished speed skater.

References

1924 births
2009 deaths
Swedish male racewalkers
Olympic silver medalists for Sweden
Athletes (track and field) at the 1948 Summer Olympics
Olympic athletes of Sweden
Medalists at the 1948 Summer Olympics
Olympic silver medalists in athletics (track and field)
20th-century Swedish people
21st-century Swedish people